Mount Lister is a massive mountain,  high, forming the highest point in the Royal Society Range of Victoria Land, Antarctica. It was discovered by the British National Antarctic Expedition (1901–1904) which named it for Lord Joseph Lister, President of the Royal Society, 1895–1900.

The spur separates the upper part of Emmanuel Glacier from the Carleton Glacier. The spur was named by the US Advisory Committee on Antarctic Names (US-ACAN) in 1994 after the University of Waikato in Hamilton, New Zealand, in association with nearby features that are named after colleges and universities.

See also
List of Ultras of Antarctica

References

Mountains of Victoria Land
Scott Coast
Four-thousanders of Antarctica